Alton is an unincorporated community located in Anderson County, Kentucky, United States. Its post office  is closed.

The community was originally known as Rough and Ready after the nickname of United States President Zachary Taylor. The town was incorporated under this name in 1850.

References

Unincorporated communities in Anderson County, Kentucky
Unincorporated communities in Kentucky